Yuliya Mayarchuk, born  in Mykolaiv, Ukraine (when it was part of the Soviet Union), is a Ukrainian actress.

She had the lead role in the 2000 movie Trasgredire by Tinto Brass.

Filmography
 1999 : Sogno
 2000 : Picasso's Face
 2000 : Trasgredire (Cheeky)
 2000 : La Squadra, TV show
 2002 : L'Italiano
 2006 : Il rumore delle molliche
 2007 : In nome di Maria
 2007 : Go Go Tales
 2010 : La vita è una cosa meravigliosa

References

External links

Filmogren
Russian site

1977 births
Living people
Ukrainian film actresses
Ukrainian television actresses
Italian film actresses
Italian television actresses
Actors from Mykolaiv
Ukrainian emigrants to Italy